Pro Box New Zealand Association (Pro Box NZ) is one of the four governing bodies for the sport of professional boxing in New Zealand. Pro Box NZ is a non-profit organisation.

History
Pro Box NZ was founded in 2012 by Torchy George located in Hamilton, New Zealand. The organisation was a small organisation at first only doing two to four events a year in Waikato and Bay of Plenty area. Steve Scott became president of the organisation in 2018. Since Scott became president, he turned the organisation into a nationwide organisation and becoming direct competitors of the other major organisations in New Zealand.

Current roles

Board members
President: Torchy George

Current national champions

Men

Female

Current provincial champions

Inter-Island title

Cruiserweight Men

South Island title

Cruiserweight Men

Super Middleweight Men

Regional Champions

Pacific Titles

Cruiserweight title

Light Heavyweight title

Super Middleweight title

Middleweight Pacific title

Super Welterweight title

Super Lightweight title

Super Featherweight title

Boxing and Wrestling Act 1981

See also
List of New Zealand female boxing champions
List of New Zealand heavyweight boxing champions
List of New Zealand cruiserweight boxing champions
List of New Zealand light heavyweight boxing champions
List of New Zealand super middleweight boxing champions
List of New Zealand middleweight boxing champions
List of New Zealand super welterweight boxing champions
List of New Zealand welterweight boxing champions
List of New Zealand super lightweight boxing champions
List of New Zealand lightweight boxing champions
List of New Zealand super featherweight boxing champions
List of New Zealand featherweight boxing champions
List of New Zealand bantamweight boxing champions

References

Sports governing bodies in New Zealand
Boxing in New Zealand
Professional boxing organizations